"Carolyna" is a song by British singer-songwriter, Melanie C. It was released as the second single to be taken from her album, This Time in United Kingdom and European territories. Although Melanie worked hard on promotion for the single, it didn't have the impact that was hoped and sales stalled, also failing to help the sales of This Time. "Carolyna" reached number forty-nine in the UK Singles Chart where it sold over 6,391 copies in the first week, and fared little better in other European countries, selling over 200,000 copies worldwide.

In February 2008, the song and its video was put on the playlist of MuchMoreMusic and added to MTV's website in Canada. The song charted at #1 on its first week in MuchMoreMusic singles Top 10. According to EMI Music Canada, "Carolyna" was the first single for the Canadian release of the album This Time in April 2008.

Composition
"Carolyna" is a song about a girl who has had a rough start in life and needs to escape to find freedom and happiness. Melanie revealed during her interview at Loose Women, that she wrote this song after watching a documentary in America about young kids living in the streets; and that the danger of homelessness was something that always scared her in her childhood.

Music video
The music video was directed by Tim Royes and was shot on 3 May 2007, and it was the final video he directed before his death. The video sees Melanie as the guardian angel of a girl, played by actress Christina Chong, who is facing problems in her own life such as alcoholism, fighting with the boyfriend and non-stop partying. Whenever the girl looks herself at the mirror, she will see Melanie looking at her. Throughout the video, Melanie is also seen in the places where the girl was seen having problems such as the living room of the girl's house, the room where the girl was seen partying and the bedroom of the girl where at the end of the music video, Melanie then appears and spreads open her arms as a gesture of aid. The camera shows the tattoos on Melanie's wrists, which read "Love" and "Happiness" in Thai.

Chart performance
The single peaked at number forty-nine in the UK Singles Chart and charted for only one week, becoming Melanie C's first single not to chart inside the top 40 in the United Kingdom. It received low promotion in the United Kingdom because it was released in the week when the Spice Girls announced their reunion. The single was more successful in Germany and Italy where it was a Top 20 hit. Eventually "Carolyna" became a radio hit in some parts of Europe. The single was a hit in Portugal, reaching the top spot for 1 week.

Formats and track listings
These are the formats and track listings of major single releases of "Carolyna".

Europe CD maxi single
 "Carolyna"  3:21
 "Carolyna"  3:17
 "I Want Candy"  3:22
 "Carolyna"  3:17
 "Carolyna"  5:20

UK CD maxi single
 "Carolyna" 
 "Carolyna" 
 "Carolyna" 
 "First Day of My Life"

UK 7-inch vinyl/iTunes Single
 "Carolyna" 
 "Fragile"

UK DVD single
 "Carolyna" 
 "First Day of My Life" 
 "Fragile"

Live performances
Melanie C performed the song on the following events:
 Isle of Wight Festival 2007
 Live at the Hammerstein Ballroom, NYC
 This Time Canadian Tour
 Live at the Hard Rock Cafe

Release history

Charts

References

External links
 Official site

2007 singles
Melanie C songs
Pop ballads
Rock ballads
Songs written by Steve Mac
Songs written by Melanie C
Song recordings produced by Steve Mac
Music videos directed by Tim Royes
2006 songs
Number-one singles in Portugal